Bull Fighting is a 2007 Taiwanese drama starring Mike He, Hebe Tien, and Lee Wei. The series was broadcast on free-to-air Taiwan Television (TTV) (台視) from 18 November 2007 to 9 March 2008, on Sunday at 22:00 and cable TV Sanlih E-Television (SET) (三立電視) from 24 November 2007 to 15 March 2008, on Saturday at 21:00. The word 鬥牛 in this context actually means street basketball.

Cast
Mike He (賀軍翔) as Shen Ruo He 沈若赫 
Hebe Tien (田馥甄)as Yi Sheng Xue 伊勝雪
Lee Wei (李威) as Jin Zi Cong 金子聰 
Liang Zhe (亮哲) as Zhou Bi Shou 周必守
Huang Pai Jun (黃柏鈞) as Xu Zhe Kai 徐哲凱
Godfrey Gao (高以翔) as Tank 坦克
Ding Chun Cheng (丁春誠) as Roma
Cao Wei Xuan (曹維軒) as Mu Yu 木魚
George Zhang (張兆志) as Run Yi 潤乙
Zhang Li Ren (張力仁) as Ah Jia 阿嘉
Jian Chang (檢場) as Yi Chuan Wu 伊全武
Cyndi Chaw (趙詠華) as Gao Jie Mei 高潔美
Ai Wei (艾偉) as Shen Guo Shen 沈國琛
Tan Ai Zhen (譚艾珍) as Mrs. Shen 沈老夫人
Xie Qi Wen (謝其文) as Sausage vendor 香腸伯
Hu Kang Xing (胡康星) as Bi Xiao Xiu 畢小修
Peggy Zheng (曾珮瑜) as Liang Yu Qin 梁羽親
Lin Shou Jun (林秀君) as President He 賀總裁
Wang De Sheng (王德生) as Butler Shi 石管家
Ke Huan Ru (柯奐如) as He Qian Na 賀千那
Chen Wei Han (陳威翰) as Jia Bao Bei 賈寶貝
Wang Xin Yi (王心宜) as Mei Fei 梅妃
Zhang Yong Zheng (張永正) as Uncle Louie
Wang Juan (王琄) as Bo Luo Shen 菠蘿嬸
Chien Te-men (乾德門) as School doctor
Zhu De Gang (朱德剛) as Guan Fu Lu 官福祿
Judy Zhou (周定緯) as Michael
Chen Han-dian as Unemployed man
Lene Lai (賴琳恩) as 學校秘書

Synopsis

A basketball match held every year for the winning team to dominate the court and a girl who has fond memories of Trio, the side she supports. Sounds perfectly normal except that there is a story behind her preference. 
When she was little, Yi Sheng Xue was chased by a few hoodlums and found herself running to the 13th Street Basketball Court for safety. The players representing Trio, then, noticed what was happening and saved her from the thugs. Due to this incident, Sheng Xue developed a fondness for the Trio team and rooted for its players every year since then. The boys, reigning champions for nine years, finally met their match and nobody could have been more disappointed than Sheng Xue.

This year, three young men from the East Sun College represented Trio. They were childhood friends and the rich, arrogant sons of important people. The leader, Sheng Rou He, encountered Sheng Xue and her bodyguards in a car accident on his way to the match, causing a rift between him and her men. Little did Sheng Xue realize that her childhood confidante and the leader of the bumbling bodyguards, Jin Zi Cong, had deflated Rou He's tires. He also left a hole in the Trio captain's bag, causing him to be late for the match. As a result, Rou struggled to beat the opposing team wearing small shoes. Alas, Trio lost.

The feisty Sheng Xue, daughter of a former triad leader, vowed revenge against Rou He and admitted herself in his college, apprehending him whenever possible. Meanwhile, Rou He shares a strained relationship with his father, a powerful businessman who plans to obtain the deed to the 13th Street. Rou He's past affair with his ex-girlfriend who left him due to his obsession with his father's work and a blind date arranged by his side to secure the deed meant that Rou He had no choice but to fake a relationship with Sheng Xue since 13th Street rightly belongs to her family.

Little does Sheng Xue realize that her hatred for Rou He slowly turns to affection and Zi Cong looks at them in the dark with a heavy heart.

Soundtrack

Bull Fighting Original Soundtrack (CD+DVD) (鬥牛要不要 電視原聲帶) was released on 7 December 2007 by Various Artists under HIM International Music. It contains twenty songs, in which twelve songs are various instrumental versions of the eight original songs. The album also includes a DVD. The opening theme song is "Dou Niu Yao Bu Yao" or "Do You Want To Bull Fight" by Tank, while the ending theme song is by S.H.E entitled "Zui Jing Hai Hao Ma?" or "How Are You Lately?".

The album won Best Original Soundtrack at the 2009 HITO Radio Music Awards presented by Taiwanese radio station Hit FM.

Track listing

International broadcast
 Bull Fighting aired in the Philippines in GMA Network from 2 November 2009 – 23 November 2009, in Tagalog-dubbed. Bull Fighting'''s name has been changed into Freestyle''. Also, the original audio with English subtitles being broadcast in TeleAsia Chinese from 12 April 2014.

References

Taiwanese drama television series
Taiwan Television original programming
Sanlih E-Television original programming
2007 Taiwanese television series debuts
2008 Taiwanese television series endings
Basketball television series